Willy Rudolf Foerster (15 July 1905 – 19 February 1966) was a German engineer and industrialist in Japan who rescued Jews during the Holocaust. He founded the F. & K. Engineering Company and the German-Japanese Machine Tool Company, called Nichidoku Kikai Seisakujo, in Tokyo. Foerster was a leading industrialist and one of the richest foreigners in Japan.

Early life
Born in Reichenbach im Vogtland, Germany in 1905, the son of a textile engineer. Studied mechanical engineering in Zwickau and Berlin and worked for both Krupp and BMW.

War

Rescue of Jewish refugees 
With the help of the "Jewish Refugee Committee" he employed a sizable number of Jewish refugees from Germany and the occupied territories in his company. Being anti-Nazi, he organized, together with the "Jewish Refugee Committee" in Tokyo, the entry of his new employees and their families to Japan. Despite the enormous pressure of the Nazi party and the German missions abroad in Tokyo and Yokohama, he refused to dismiss his staff members. Publicly he dissociated himself from NS policy and called himself a "stateless person".

Hans Alexander Straus (Columbia Records) and Karl Rosenberg (Liebermann-Waelchli & Co.) in Tokyo, who organized the committee, received application documents from persecuted Jews in Germany and the German-occupied territories which they forwarded to Foerster. Foerster then provided a free passage to Japan. The family men worked at Foerster's company and their children attended school. In this way, a sizable number of Jewish refugees from Germany, Austria, and other countries, such as Czechoslovakia, came to Japan. In a letter written in 1939 to a stateless Jewish engineer in Germany, who had lost his job because of his Jewish descent, Rosenberg described Foerster as a man of "extraordinary independence, full of character and without prejudice". But even though the engineer was able to provide a passport without imprinted "J" and an employment contract with Foerster's company, the Japanese denied the entry of the family. But Foerster – as Rosenberg described – "worked desperately" to get a permission for the family to enter Japan. At least, like in other cases, he was successful. Shortly afterwards Rosenberg noted overjoyed, that Foerster was able, "despite extreme difficulties", to convince the Japanese authorities. Several other cases are documented. At the end of 1940, Foerster saved the children of one of his employees in Vienna from deportation to a concentration camp. Some months after their arrival in Japan they were deprived of citizenship by the German consulate in Yokohama. But Foerster was able to prevent the deportation of the whole family to the Shanghai Ghetto at the very last moment.

Defamation as an alleged criminal by German diplomats 
Because of his resistance work, Foerster was defamed as an alleged criminal by German diplomats in Tokyo and Yokohama. For this purpose, they used a forged criminal record, which they spread in the German community. After the war, it was also handed over by the Japanese to the Allied Forces in Japan to discredit Foerster. It was based on the criminal record of a namesake of Foerster. This man was imprisoned several times in Germany for theft, dealing with stolen goods, and sexual crimes. He was born in 1890 in Reichenbrand near Chemnitz and not in 1905 in Reichenbach in the Vogtland. His records clearly show that he was imprisoned from 23 July 1937 until 23 June 1938 in the prison of Hoheneck in Germany. At this time Foerster was already living in Japan for years as a successful businessman. But later SCAP included the forged criminal record into the Foerster-file, which led, in combination with false statements of interested parties, e. g. former officials, to the destruction of Foerster's credibility.

Arrest 
Because of his strong opposition against NS policy and anti-Semitism he, his Japanese wife, and several employees were arrested on 24 May 1943 by the Japanese Kenpeitai at the instigation of German authorities, who fraudulently denounced him as a "Soviet spy". Foerster was tortured (also by Josef Meisinger) and forced to sell his factory to a Japanese company. He was imprisoned for more than a year and released on 13 June 1944. Foerster was acquitted on being a "spy" by a Japanese court, but he was sentenced on probation i. a. because of anti-war propaganda and stirring up the public. Some days later he was placed under house arrest.
 
On 17 May 1945, Foerster was arrested again as an "anti-Nazi" element, at the instigation of Meisinger. Together with Jews from Germany and Allied citizens (e. g. Catholic nuns) he was interned at Tokyo Koishikawa. Foerster was elected spokesman and supplied the detainees with additional food rations, which he purchased with the help of a German woman, who was married to an Indian citizen. At the time of the great bombing of Tokyo, during the night of 25 to 26 May 1945, it was largely thanks to him that the inmates left the camp alive. Foerster disarmed the guard and helped the internees out of the burning house. On 15 August 1945, the camp was liberated by American forces.

Post-war

Results of SCAP / CIC investigations 
After the war, Foerster and his family lived at Lake Nojiri where he owned a house. The Allied forces in Japan carried out extensive investigations. Former German diplomats and others were interrogated. SCAP-files on Foerster show that interested parties were able to discredit him. Internal investigations of the Counter Intelligence Corps (CIC) revealed that Foerster was a sincere "anti-Nazi", who employed Jewish refugees in his company and was therefore regarded as "persona non grata" by German NS authorities. It was determined that Foerster was accused of anti-war propaganda, arrested twice as "anti-Nazi", and that he was denounced by the "Butcher of Warsaw", Josef Meisinger, to Japanese authorities.

Expropriation and forced repatriation to Germany 
Despite these results and the fact that Foerster had been a stateless person since 1936, his property in Japan was expropriated and he was deported to Germany as an alleged Nazi, together with his wife and their daughter. Jewish friends who tried to help him were told that they were "only stateless foreigners", that Foerster "lies whenever he opens his mouth" and that he "never was arrested because of political terms". It was also mentioned that it could be dangerous for them to interfere in Foerster's case.

Results of German court investigations 
Back in Germany, it took nearly twenty years for German courts to come to the same conclusions as the CIC did before Foerster's forceful repatriation. After questioning a lot of witnesses, the judges of the higher regional court in Frankfurt am Main decided, that Foerster had been persecuted by Meisinger because of his antagonism against National Socialism and his resistance work, especially the employment of Jewish refugees. The court also stated that Meisinger had fraudulently denounced Foerster as a "spy", knowing that the Japanese would at the very least detain him for a long time. The judges declared that Meisinger had used the Japanese as an "instrument" of persecution. A few months after this decision, Foerster died. He was never rehabilitated publicly.

On 28 August 2018, the biography of Willy Rudolf Foerster, the ″Schindler″ of Tokyo, was publicly presented at the Haus der Geschichte in Bonn. In a lecture, the author Clemens Jochem presented individual biographies of Jewish employees rescued by Foerster, photos, and essential new documents relating to the Foerster case.

References

Sources

Books 

 [Memoirs of an employee of Foerster. Petroff provides, except some inaccuracies (e. g. date of Foerster's arrest), an authentic insight into Foerster's anti-Nazi attitude, his persecution by the Gestapo and his arrest and expropriation by Japanese authorities.]

Journals

Interviews / Oral History 
 Interview with Margaret A. Bendahan, née Liebeskind, about her escape to Japan and her arrest and torture as an alleged "spy" at the instigation of German authorities. 27 August 1991, United States Holocaust Memorial Museum Collection. Mrs. Bendahan was a close friend of the Stern family, who was rescued by Willy Rudolf Foerster. He is mentioned several times in the interview: 01:42:00 - 01:47:00 h (part 1/2), 01:56:00 - 01:57:30 h (part 1/2), 00:12:00 - 00:18:00 (part 2/2). A sworn statement by Margaret Bendahan dated 30 March 1963 is quoted on pp. 94-95 in "Der Fall Foerster".

1966 deaths
1905 births
People from Reichenbach im Vogtland
German humanitarians
People who rescued Jews during the Holocaust